Hoodoo Lake is an alpine lake in Custer County, Idaho, United States, located in the White Cloud Mountains in the Sawtooth National Recreation Area.  No trails lead to the lake, but it can be accessed from Sawtooth National Forest road 666.

Hoodoo Lake is upstream and southwest of the Slate Creek Hot Springs.

References

See also
 List of lakes of the White Cloud Mountains
 Sawtooth National Recreation Area
 White Cloud Mountains

Lakes of Idaho
Lakes of Custer County, Idaho
Glacial lakes of the United States
Glacial lakes of the Sawtooth National Forest